Kasim Rabihić (born 24 February 1993) is a German professional footballer who plays as a winger for  club 1. FC Saarbrücken.

Career
He left Verl at the end of his contract in summer 2022, and joined fellow 3. Liga club 1. FC Saarbrücken on a two-year deal.

References

External links
 
 

1993 births
Living people
German footballers
German people of Bosnia and Herzegovina descent
Footballers from Munich
Association football midfielders
BC Aichach players
TSV 1860 Munich II players
Rot-Weiss Essen players
FC Pipinsried players
Türkgücü München players
SC Verl players
1. FC Saarbrücken players
3. Liga players
Regionalliga players